Solesino is a comune (municipality) in the Province of Padua in the Italian region Veneto, located about  southwest of Venice and about  southwest of Padua.

Solesino borders the following municipalities: Granze, Monselice, Pozzonovo, Sant'Elena, Stanghella.

Demographic evolution

References

Cities and towns in Veneto